Ary Abittan (born 31 January 1974) is a French actor and humorist.

Life and career

Ary Abittan was born on January 31, 1974, in Paris. He comes from a Sephardic Jewish (Maghrebi Jewish) family. His father is from Morocco and his mother from Tunisia. He spent part of his childhood between Garges-lès-Gonesse and Sarcelles.
At age 19, he became a taxi driver, like his father, an activity that allowed him to finance his first theater lessons.

In 1993, Ary Abittan wrote (in parallel of theater lessons) his first sketches and then performed on stage since 1994
In 2007, he took the lead role in a play, Happy Hanukah, which Jean-Luc Moreau directed. The same year, he plays the main role during three seasons of Nos années pension, broadcast on France 2.

In 2012, he plays in Dépression et des potes of Arnaud Lemort. The same year, he made his first participation in Marrakech du rire.
In 2014, he plays in Serial (Bad) Weddings with Christian Clavier and Chantal Lauby by Philippe de Chauveron.

Filmography

Feature films

Television

References

External links

 

1974 births
Living people
21st-century French male actors
French male film actors
French male television actors
Male actors from Paris
French humorists
Jewish French writers
21st-century French Sephardi Jews
French male writers